Samara University (SU), Ethiopia, is a government higher education institution located in the small town of Semera (population range of 2,500-9,999 inhabitants), Afar Region. Officially accredited by the Ministry of Education (MOE), Ethiopia, Samara University is a coeducational higher education institution. Samara University offers courses and programs leading to officially recognized higher education degrees such as bachelor's degrees in several areas of study. Since its inception in 2008, Samara University is making great leaps towards producing competent and dynamic graduates who fulfill the needs and aspirations of the people. SU also provides several academic and non-academic facilities and services to students including a library, as well as administrative services.

External links

Afar Region
Universities and colleges in Ethiopia